Jo Ye-rin (born 2008) is a South Korean child actress. She gained recognition for her role as Ho Ryeong in the drama Lovers of the Red Sky.

Filmography

Television series

Film

Awards and nominations

References

External links 
 
 

2008 births
Living people
South Korean child actresses
21st-century South Korean actresses
South Korean television actresses